Eomastix is a genus of midges in the family Cecidomyiidae. Eomastix incerta is the only described species in this genus and is known from Norway and Sweden. The genus was established by Mathias Jaschhof in 2009.

References

Cecidomyiidae genera
Insects described in 2009
Taxa named by Mathias Jaschhof
Diptera of Europe
Monotypic Diptera genera

Diptera of Scandinavia